Sugar Mountain – Live at Canterbury House 1968 is a live album by Canadian / American musician Neil Young.  On November 8–10, 1968, Young performed three solo acoustic shows at Canterbury House in Ann Arbor, Michigan. This album is compiled from the performances on the 9th and 10th.

This album is Volume 00 in the Archives Performance Series. Since volumes 2 and 3 had already been released, this album, though performed earlier chronologically, is the third release from the Series. The Riverboat 1969, released in The Archives Vol. 1 1963–1972 in 2009, is the fourth Archive Performance Series released but was performed earlier chronologically than volumes 2 and 3.

The album was released only as a CD/DVD set, with the DVD containing a high-definition audio version of the album, playable on standard DVD players. The DVD also contains a trailer for Young's Archives Vol. 1 box set.

The recording of the song "Sugar Mountain" from this appearance was previously released as a single B-side and on Young's 1977 compilation album Decade.

A vinyl record version of the album, pressed on 200-gram Japanese vinyl, was released in April 2009.

The album's cover is a photograph of Young taken in 1967 by Linda Eastman, later the wife of Paul McCartney.

Track listing
All compositions written by Neil Young except where indicated.
Disc 1  (CD)
 Emcee intro – 0:45
 "On the Way Home" – 2:52
 Songwriting Rap – 3:13
 "Mr. Soul" – 3:14
 Recording Rap – 0:30
 "Expecting to Fly" – 2:49
 "The Last Trip to Tulsa" – 8:36
 Bookstore Rap – 4:27
 "The Loner" – 4:41
 "I Used to..." Rap – 0:38
 "Birds – 2:17
 "Winterlong" (excerpt) and "Out of My Mind" Intro – 1:38
 "Out of My Mind" – 2:07
 "If I Could Have Her Tonight" – 2:34
 Classical Gas Rap (Mason Williams/Young) – 0:41
 "Sugar Mountain" Intro – 0:29
 "Sugar Mountain" – 5:47
 "I've Been Waiting for You" – 2:04
 Songs rap – 0:38
 "Nowadays Clancy Can't Even Sing" – 4:43
 Tuning Rap and "The Old Laughing Lady" Intro – 3:06
 "The Old Laughing Lady" – 7:26
 "Broken Arrow" – 5:09

Bonus tracks
 "I Am a Child" (iTunes-only bonus track) –
 "#1 Hit Record Rap" (hidden MP3 bonus track) –

Disc 2  (DVD-Audio)
 Emcee intro – 0:45
 "On the Way Home" – 2:52
 Songwriting Rap – 3:13
 "Mr. Soul" – 3:14
 Recording Rap – 0:30
 "Expecting to Fly" – 2:49
 "The Last Trip to Tulsa" – 8:36
 Bookstore Rap – 4:27
 "The Loner" – 4:41
 "I Used to..." Rap – 0:38
 "Birds – 2:17
 "Winterlong" (excerpt) and "Out of My Mind" Intro – 1:38
 "Out of My Mind" – 2:07
 "If I Could Have Her Tonight" – 2:34
 Classical Gas Rap (Williams/Young) – 0:41
 "Sugar Mountain" Intro – 0:29
 "Sugar Mountain" – 5:47
 "I've Been Waiting for You" – 2:04
 Songs rap – 0:38
 "Nowadays Clancy Can't Even Sing" – 4:43
 Tuning Rap and "The Old Laughing Lady" Intro – 3:06
 "The Old Laughing Lady" – 7:26
 "Broken Arrow" – 5:09

Personnel
Neil Young - guitar, vocals

Recorded at Canterbury House  Ann Arbor, MI  November 9 & 10, 1968

Production
Produced by: Neil Young
Archivist: Joel Bernstein
Analog Restoration, Analog to Digital Transfers by John Nowland at His Master's Wheels, Woodside, CA
Digital Editing and Mastering by Tim Mulligan at Redwood Digital, Woodside CA
John Hausmann, Assisting Engineer
Harry Sitam, Senior Technical Engineer

DVD Production
Directed by Bernard Shakey
Produced by L.A. Johnson
Executive Producer: Elliot Rabinowitz
Art Director: Toshi Onuki
Production Coordinator: Will Mitchell

The Neil Young Archives Vol.1 Trailer
Produced by Raena Winscott
Edited by Bill Berg-Hillenger
Additional Post Production at TotalMedia Group
DVD Authoring: Blink Digital, NYC

Charts

References

Neil Young live albums
2008 live albums
Reprise Records live albums
Live country rock albums
Reprise Records compilation albums
Country rock compilation albums
2008 compilation albums
Neil Young compilation albums
1968 in Michigan
Culture of Ann Arbor, Michigan